Tisca Zareen Chopra (née Arora; born 1 November 1973) is an Indian actress, author and film producer who has appeared in over 45 feature films, predominantly in Hindi language.

Taare Zameen Par, her best known feature film, was India's official entry to the Academy Awards. It also won her Filmfare and other top nominations. Another feature film, Qissa, premiered at the Toronto Film Festival in 2013, and won the NETPAC Award for Best Asian Film. The film has travelled to over 24 festivals, winning over almost all top awards and much appreciation from audiences and critics. Tisca did her bachelor's degree in English literature from University of Delhi and worked extensively in theatre. She has honed her craft with Naseeruddin Shah and theatre director Feroz Khan. Her performance in the Pulitzer Award-winning play, Dinner With Friends, that deals with the state of the modern marriage, was a hit in India, South East Asia and the Middle East, garnering praise from both critics and audiences. She has worked with Sam Pitroda on the National Knowledge Commission, to help with revamping the education system.

Her book Acting Smart (HarperCollins), is a best seller and is being translated into Hindi. Her second book What's Up With Me? was released in March 2021. This book is about demystifying menstruation and puberty for young girls. Tisca has been nominated at the New York Indian Film Festival for Best Actress for her work in 10Ml Love, a film based on A Midsummer Night's Dream. The series won Best Ensemble Cast. She's been on the Jury of the MAMI (Mumbai Academy Of Moving Images) film festival. Chutney, a short film she wrote and produced under her company, The Eastern Way won two Filmfare Awards (Best Actress & Best Short Film). She is now developing two feature film scripts. Her upcoming projects are Bioscopewala, 3Dev and The Hungry (based on the Shakespeare play Titus Andronicus). One of the most beautiful and stylish actresses, Tisca is often on the best-dressed list and is a favourite with advertisers, endorsing brands like Tanishq, Titan eyewear, Olay, Horlicks, Marks & Spencer, Godrej, Bajaj Motors and Kellogg's.

Early life and education
Tisca Chopra was born in Kasauli, Himachal Pradesh into a family of educationists. She grew up in Kabul, Afghanistan, as her father was posted as the principal of India International School and later moved back to Delhi. She graduated from Apeejay School, Noida, where her father was the principal. Later she studied English literature at Hindu College, University of Delhi. She also started working actively with amateur theatre. While at college, she started writing for several publications and acting in plays for an amateur theatre group and college festivals. After finishing her education, she moved to Mumbai and trained in acting with notable theatre greats Feroz Abbas Khan and Naseeruddin Shah She is the grand-niece of the prominent Indian writer Khushwant Singh.

Career

She has won two Filmfare Awards (Chutney (2016)- Best Actress and Best Short Film) Filmfare Short Film Awards#Winners' announcement. For her role in Taare Zameen Par (2007), her best known film, she won Filmfare nominations. In 2011, she appeared in the Love Breakups Zindagi with Dia Mirza and Zayed Khan. Rahasya (2015), won her The People's Choice and Best Actress at Big Star Entertainment Awards. She made her film debut with Platform (1993), opposite Ajay Devgan. She also starred in the hit play Dinner With Friends, where her character of Dia is a complex role of a failed artist. In 2004 she played the role of Prabhavati Devi in Prakash Jha's Loknayak. In 2007, she appeared in Taare Zameen Par with Aamir Khan, where her performance was much lauded. She acted in Nandita Das's directorial debut, Firaaq (2008). In 2011, she appeared in Madhur Bhandarkar's Dil Toh Baccha Hai Ji.

For 10ml Love, which is based on the Shakespearean play Midsummer Night's Dream, Tisca was nominated for Best Actress at the 11th Annual New York Indian Film Festival. Her film Ankur Arora Murder Case, written and produced by Vikram Bhatt released in May 2013. Her other notable films are Anup Singh's Qissa, with Irrfan Khan released in 2013, has travelled to over 20 festivals, winning over almost all top awards and much appreciation from audiences and critics, and Rahasya, by UVI Film Production Pvt. Ltd. She has worked in the Marathi film Highway with Umesh Kulkarni and Hindi and Tamil remakes of the Marathi film Kaksparsh, directed by Mahesh Manjrekar.

Theatre 
She acted in various plays in Mumbai and soon her work was seen Feroz Abbas Khan's Mahatma vs Gandhi, All The Best and Satyadev Dubey's Inshah Allah. She also starred in Dinner With Friends, a Pulitzer Award-winning play. The play and Tisca garnered a lot of praise from both critics and audiences and has travelled to many cities across the world.

Television
Starting her Television stint with the immensely popular short film format called Star Bestsellers, Tisca starred in two popular films, Ek Shaam Ki Mulaqat and Hum Saath Saath Hain Kya?. This paved the way for leading parts in shows like Kahaani Ghar Ghar Kii (Star Plus), Astitva...Ek Prem Kahani (Zee TV), Sarkarr:Rishton Ki Ankahi Kahani (Zee TV) and Mariyam Khan - Reporting Live (Star Plus). She hosted a consumer grievances show on (Star News) called Main Hoon Na. Tisca hosted Prayschit - Gunahon Ke Zakhm on Sony Entertainment Television, where she got a chance to reveal the transformation that criminals go through after or during their prison sentence. She starred in 24, in the year 2013. The series was a remake of the American series of the same name, produced by Anil Kapoor, directed by Abhinay Deo, which was premiered on Colors.

Advertising
Tisca has appeared in advertisements for big brands like Tanishq, Titan Eyewear, Dish TV, Kelloggs-All Bran, Horlicks-Gold, and Olay.

Personal life
Chopra is married to Capt. Sanjay Chopra who is a pilot with Air India. They have one daughter, Tara and Sanjay live in Mumbai. She works with several NGOs, supporting education and women's rights.

Filmography

Films

Television

Short films

Awards and nominations
Won
People's Choice: Stardust Best Supporting Actress Award - Taare Zameen Par
BIG Star Entertainment Awards - Best Actor (In a negative role) - Rahasya
Tisca won the "Best Actor Female" for Chutney at the Jio Filmfare Short Film Awards 2017. It's a project she not just acted in, but also produced and co-wrote. The "Best Film" (Fiction) award also went to Chutney.
 24, won Best Television series at The Indian Television Academy (ITA).

Nominated
 Filmfare Best Supporting Actress Award - Taare Zameen Par
 Stardust Awards - Best Actress in a Supporting Role (Female) - Firaaq 
 Star Screen Awards - Best Actress in a Supporting Role (Female) - Taare Zameen Par
 V. Shantaram Awards: Best Actress in a Supporting Role - Taare Zameen Par
 Zee Cine Awards Best Actress in a Supporting Role (Female) - Taare Zameen Par
 Indian Film Festival of New York Best Actress - 10ml Love

References

External links

 
 

1973 births
Living people
Actresses from Himachal Pradesh
People from Solan district
Indian film actresses
Indian stage actresses
Indian television actresses
Indian soap opera actresses
Actresses in Hindi cinema
Actresses in Marathi cinema
Actresses in Tamil cinema
Actresses in Telugu cinema
Actresses in Malayalam cinema
Apeejay School alumni
Hindu College, Delhi alumni
Indian expatriates in Afghanistan
Indian Buddhists
Converts to Sōka Gakkai
Members of Sōka Gakkai
Nichiren Buddhists
20th-century Indian actresses
21st-century Indian actresses
Actresses in Hindi television